Cundā Dhāraṇī is a popular Buddhist mantra in China associated with Cundā according to the :

Before reading the mantra, Buddhists reads these three times:

Nan Huaijin suggested adding Om Bhrūm (Ong Bu Lin) to the ending of the mantra.

In the sūtra, the Buddha speaks extensively about the various effects and benefits of reciting the Cundā Dhāraṇī. Many of the effects are purifying and uplifting in nature. For example, after pronouncing the dhāraṇī, the Buddha then says:

The dhāraṇī is also closely associated with buddhahood and complete enlightenment (Skt. ). At the end of the sūtra, the Buddha closes the teaching by saying:

See also
Nīlakaṇṭha Dhāraṇī
Usnisa Vijaya Dharani Sutra
Liao-Fan's Four Lessons

Notes

External links
 七俱胝佛母準提王：更新日誌

Buddhist mantras
Avalokiteśvara